Hartley Street School in Alice Springs (formerly Stuart), Northern Territory, Australia, was the first purpose-built school in the town. Its oldest buildings were constructed in 1929, and it opened in 1930 to cater for the growing population in the town following the completion of the railway line from Adelaide to Alice Springs.

Background 
The official opening of the Hartley Street School was on 26 February 1930 by the government resident of the day, Victor Carrington, and Pearl Burton was the first teacher appointed.

In 1945 a new kindergarten, in a unique octagonal shape, was built, designed by B.C.G. Burnett.

The School of the Air started teaching its first students from here on 20 September 1950, when the first broadcast was made.

The school closed in 1965, and in 1988 it became a museum, which is operated by the National Trust (Northern Territory).

References 

Schools in Alice Springs
Museums in Alice Springs
National Trust of Australia
Educational institutions established in 1930
Educational institutions disestablished in 1965
1930 establishments in Australia
1965 disestablishments in Australia